Jan Johan van der Vliet (born 5 March 1949) is a retired Dutch rower. He competed at the 1972 Summer Olympics in the eight event and finished in ninth place. After retiring from competitions he first worked as an orthopedic surgeon, and later, in the 2000s, as a rowing coach at the Roosendaalse Roeivereniging.

References

1949 births
Living people
Dutch male rowers
Olympic rowers of the Netherlands
Rowers at the 1972 Summer Olympics
People from Heemstede
Sportspeople from North Holland